K. lutea may refer to:

 Kermia lutea, a sea snail
 Kotschya lutea, a legume with an aeschynomenoid root nodule